Vorster (pronounced for-ster) is a surname. Notable people with the surname include:

Balthazar Johannes Vorster (1915-1983), South African politician, Prime Minister and President
Eben Vorster (born 1997), South African swimmer
Elinda Vorster (born 1965), South African sprinter
Emil Vorster (1910-1976), German racing driver and entrepreneur
Harold Vorster (born 1993), South African rugby player
Julius Vorster (1809-1876), German chemist and entrepreneur. One of the founders of Chemische Fabrik Kalk
Louis Vorster (1966-2012), South African-Namibian cricketer
Pankraz Vorster (1753-1829), Swiss bishop. The last abbot of the Abbey of Saint Gall
Pierre Vorster (born 1969), South African high jumper, African Champion 1995

See also 
Forster (surname)

Germanic-language surnames
Surnames of German origin
Afrikaans-language surnames

de:Vorster
fr:Vorster